Márk Bonnyai (born 28 June 1999) is a Hungarian professional footballer who plays for Veszprém.

Career statistics

.

References

1999 births
Living people
People from Nagyatád
Hungarian footballers
Association football goalkeepers
Kaposvári Rákóczi FC players
Nagyatádi FC players
Veszprém LC footballers
Nemzeti Bajnokság I players
Nemzeti Bajnokság II players
Nemzeti Bajnokság III players
Sportspeople from Somogy County